Franz Ignaz Oefele (26 June 1721, Posen - 18 September 1797, Munich) was a German painter, etcher, and miniaturist. His name is sometimes spelled "Öffele" and is occasionally seen as "Oeffele-Piekarski", for reasons unknown.

Life 
His father was a watchmaker from Bavaria, who died before Oefele was a year old, so he was raised by an uncle in Landsberg am Lech who operated a brewery. He then went to work for Balthasar Augustin Albrecht, the Bavarian court painter. in Munich. After some time there, working with several artists, he went to Venice and was accepted as a student by Giuseppe Nogari.

He remained there for six years, followed by studies with the English history painter John Parker and the Flemish painter Jan Frans van Bloemen in Rome. After eight years in Italy, he returned to Munich and became the court painter for Maximilian III Joseph, Elector of Bavaria. In 1770, he helped to create and was appointed the first Professor of Drawing at what would later become the Academy of Fine Arts, with an annual salary of 100 Gulden. He was also a member of the Kunstakademie Düsseldorf.

He painted primarily altarpieces and portraits. Several of his best-known portraits were made into copper engravings by Franz Xaver Jungwirth. Despite his apparent success, it is reported that he left his family in serious financial difficulties.

His older cousin was the historian and librarian, Andreas Felix von Oefele.

References

Further reading 
  
Franz Ignaz Oefele. In: Thieme-Becker, Allgemeines Lexikon der Bildenden Künstler von der Antike bis zur Gegenwart. Vol. 25, E. A. Seemann, Leipzig 1931, pg. 565.
Georg Kaspar Nagler: Neues allgemeines Künstler-Lexicon, Vol.11, pg. 418 (Online)

External links

Auktionshaus Michael Zeller: A selection of his miniatures
More works by Oefele @ ArtNet
Polish Art Corner: Portrait of Michał Suffczyński by Oefele

1721 births
1797 deaths
18th-century German painters
18th-century German male artists
German male painters
Portrait painters